Bargal is a town in the northeastern Bari region of Puntland, Somalia.

Location 
Bargal is situated in the mountainous Bari province of the autonomous Puntland state. It serves as the center of the Bargal District.

A coastal town, Bargal faces the Guardafui Channel in the Indian Ocean. It lies 26 nautical miles (30 miles) north of Gumbah, 11 nautical miles (13 miles) north of Ras Binnah, 30 nautical miles (35 miles) south of Tohen, and 35 nautical miles (40 miles) south of Cape Guardafui and the entrance to the Gulf of Aden.

Overview 

The book Migiurtinia Ed Il Territorio Del Nugál says the following: "Bargaal is the habitual residence of Boqor Osman Mahmud. The village is mainly inhabited by Majeerteen Siwaaqroon and Osman Mahmud amounting to about 600 people. There are four forts, the Kings house, sixteen other brick buildings and about 200 huts. Drinking water, slightly brackish, is available on site. The village is divided into two parts: old Bargal and Eirod;  the Sultan lives in the latter. 

(Footnote) This monograph was written in early 1925, that is, before the military occupation of the Sultanate took place. Bargal no longer exists: it was bombed and razed to the ground on the 28 and 29 of October, 1925."

In June 2007, it was the location of the Battle of Bargal.

In 2012, the Puntland Highway Authority (PHA) announced a project to connect Bargal and other cities in Puntland to the main regional highway. The 750 km thoroughfare links major cities in the northern part of Somalia, such as Bosaso, Galkayo and Garowe, with towns in the south.

Demographics 
As of 2016, Bargal District had a population of around 53,200 inhabitants.

Education 
Bargal has a number of academic institutions. According to the Puntland Ministry of Education, there are three primary schools, one secondary school and institute in the Bargal District. These include Wadikhayr, Taageer and Bargaal Primary.

References 

Bari, Somalia